Enrico Kulovits (born 29 December 1974 in Güttenbach) is an Austrian football manager and former player who manages AKA Burgenland U18.

References

1974 births
Living people
Austrian footballers
Association football midfielders
Grazer AK players
Xanthi F.C. players
FC Admira Wacker Mödling players
SV Mattersburg players
FC Lustenau players
Austrian football managers
Grazer AK managers